David Walter Manville (born 18 August 1934) is a former English cricketer.  Manville was a right-handed batsman who fielded as a wicket-keeper.  He was born at Hollingbury, Sussex.

Manville made three first-class appearances for Sussex in the 1956 County Championship against Warwickshire, Kent and Leicestershire.  In his three matches, he scored a total of 13 runs at an average of 2.60, with a high score of 8.

References

External links
David Manville at ESPNcricinfo
David Manville at CricketArchive

1934 births
Living people
Sportspeople from Brighton
English cricketers
Sussex cricketers
Wicket-keepers